Steve Gillispie in an American college baseball coach, formerly the head coach of the Youngstown State Penguins baseball program. He served in that role from 2013–2016.

Gillispie played college baseball at Northwest Missouri State and Fort Hays State, and began his coaching career at Fort Hays State. His early coaching stops included assisting for two seasons each at Nebraska (where he recruited current head coach and former major leaguer Darin Erstad) and Mendocino College followed by one season each at Lassen College and Utah before two seasons at UAB. He then scouted for the Philadelphia Phillies from 1997 through 2001 before returning to coaching as an assistant at Jacksonville State. While with the Gamecocks, helped lead a turnaround that resulted in nine 30 win seasons in Gillispie's 11 years. Gillispie was hired to his first head coaching job at Youngstown State in July 2012. In 2014, despite finishing the regular season in last place, Gillispie led Youngstown State to the Horizon League Conference Tournament championship, advancing to the NCAA Regionals for the first time since 2004.

Head coaching record
The following table shows Gillispie's record as a head coach.

References

External links 
 Youngstown profile

Living people
People from Beatrice, Nebraska
Fort Hays State Tigers baseball coaches
Fort Hays State Tigers baseball players
Jacksonville State Gamecocks baseball coaches
Mendocino Eagles baseball coaches
Nebraska Cornhuskers baseball coaches
Northwest Missouri State Bearcats baseball players
Philadelphia Phillies scouts
UAB Blazers baseball coaches
Utah Utes baseball coaches
Youngstown State Penguins baseball coaches
Mendocino College people
Year of birth missing (living people)